The long ton, (symbol: LT) also known as the imperial ton or displacement ton, is the name for the unit called the "ton" in the avoirdupois system of weights or Imperial system of measurements. It was standardised in the 13th century. It is used in the United Kingdom and several other Commonwealth of Nations countries alongside the mass-based metric tonne defined in 1799, as well as in the United States for bulk commodities.

It is not to be confused with the short ton, a unit of weight equal to  used in the United States, and in Canada before metrication, also referred to simply as a "ton".

Unit definition
A long ton is defined as exactly 2,240 pounds. The long ton arises from the traditional British measurement system: A long ton is 20 long hundredweight (cwt), each of which is 8 stone (1 stone = 14 pounds). Thus a long ton is 20 × 8 × 14 lb = 2,240 lb.

Unit equivalences
A long ton, also called the weight ton (W/T), imperial ton, or displacement ton, is equal to:
 
 exactly 12% more than the 2,000 pounds of the North American short ton, because of the use of 20 long hundredweight (112 lb) rather than 20 short hundredweight (100 lb)

United Kingdom
To comply with the practices of the European Union, the British Imperial ton was explicitly excluded from use for trade by the United Kingdom's Weights and Measures Act of 1985.  The measure used since then is metric ton, identified through the word "tonne".

If still used for measurement then the word "ton", is taken to refer to an imperial or long ton.

North America
In the United States, the long ton is commonly used in measuring the displacement of ships, the volume-to-carrying-weight of fuels, and in trade of baled commodities and bulk goods like iron ore and elemental sulfur.

International Trade
The long ton is traditionally used as the unit of weight in international contracts for many bulk goods and commodities.

See also
 Ton

References

Units of mass
Ton, long
Customary units of measurement in the United States